Paul Cézanne was a French artist.

Cezanne may also refer to:
 Cezanne (crater)
 Cezanne (horse)
 Cézanne (typeface), a typeface based on the Paul Cézanne's handwriting
 Saif al Nazi or Cezanne, bassist of Artcell
 AMD Cezanne, an Accelerated Processing Unit (APU) series by AMD

People with the name 
 Cezanne Khan, Indian actor
 Jörg Cezanne (born 1958), German politician
 Cézanne, Miss Continental 1994

See also 
 Césanne, a municipality in Piedmont
 Sézanne, a commune in the French department of Marne